"Heaven's on Fire" is a song by the American rock band Kiss. Written by vocalist/guitarist Paul Stanley and songwriter Desmond Child, it was the first single released from the group's 1984 album Animalize.

Background 
Released as a single internationally in 1984, "Heaven's on Fire" charted in several countries, even though it failed to reach the top ten in any of the countries where it was released as a single. It did reach #11 on Billboard's Hot Mainstream Rock Tracks and #49 on the Billboard Hot 100. In addition, the song is one of only a select few from the bands' non-makeup era that has been performed live after the band returned to wearing makeup.

A video for the single was filmed and played on MTV, and was directed by David Lewis and produced by John Weaver. It marked the only official promotional performance of the band with lead guitarist Mark St. John before he left the group due to problems in his hands caused by a painful, but temporary, form of arthritis called reactive arthritis. St. John would be replaced shortly afterwards by Bruce Kulick.

A live version of the song was recorded at Cobo Hall on December 8, 1984, as part of the Kiss: Animalize Live Uncensored video, and was later released on the Hear 'n Aid album. It is one of only three live tracks with longtime drummer Eric Carr that Kiss has ever officially released. The other two are "Talk To Me" and "New York Groove".

Personnel 
Kiss
Paul Stanley – lead vocals, rhythm guitar
Gene Simmons – bass guitar, backing vocals
Eric Carr – drums, backing vocals
Mark St. John – lead guitar

Additional musician
Desmond Child – backing vocals

References

External links 
 The KISS FAQ – DISCOGRAPHY – Hear 'N Aid (1985)

Kiss (band) songs
1984 singles
Songs written by Desmond Child
Songs written by Paul Stanley
1984 songs
Mercury Records singles